The 2018–19 season is Huddersfield Town's 110th year in existence and second season in the Premier League following promotion via the 2017 Championship play-off Final. The club has finished their FA Cup and EFL Cup campaigns. They suffered the joint-earliest relegation to the Championship since Derby County in 2008 after a 2–0 defeat to Crystal Palace on 30 March 2019.

The season covers the period from 1 July 2018 to 30 June 2019.

Technical staff

First team players

New contracts

Transfers

In

Loan in

Out

Loan out

Pre-season

Friendlies

Competitions

Overview

Premier League

League table

Results summary

Results by matchday

Matches
On 14 June 2018, the Premier League fixtures for the forthcoming season were announced.

FA Cup

The third round draw was made live on BBC by Ruud Gullit and Paul Ince from Stamford Bridge on 3 December 2018.

EFL Cup

The second-round draw was made from the Stadium of Light on 16 August.

Squad statistics

Awards

Huddersfield Town Blue & White Foundation Player of the Month Award

Awarded monthly to the player that was chosen by members of the Blue & White Foundation voting on htafc.com

References

Huddersfield Town A.F.C. seasons
Huddersfield Town